The 1992 World Badminton Grand Prix was the tenth edition of the World Badminton Grand Prix finals. It was held in Kuala Lumpur, Malaysia, from December 16 to December 20, 1992.

Final results

References
Smash: World Grand Prix Finals, Kuala Lumpur 1992

World Grand Prix
World Badminton Grand Prix
B
Badminton tournaments in Malaysia
Sport in Kuala Lumpur
World Badminton Grand Prix